Mishkal Mosque (Malayalam: മിശ്കാൽ പള്ളി, also spelled Mithqal Mosque) is a medieval mosque located in Calicut on Malabar Coast, southern India. The mosque, one of the few surviving medieval mosques in Kerala, is regarded as an important cultural, historical and architectural monument of Kerala. 

The mosque was built by the eponymous Muslim merchant-shipowner (nakhuda) in the 14th century. Mishkal - active in Calicut in the 1340s -  possessed "great wealth" and a fleet of ships for "the trade with India, China, Yemen, and Persia". Ship-owners known as the nakhudas were among the wealthiest merchants of medieval Indian Ocean world.

Mishkal Mosque is located in Kuttichira neighbourhood, a part of Thekkepuram beach in Calicut.

In January 1510,the mosque was partially burned in a Portuguese attack on Calicut by Albuquerque which also occupied the Zamorin's palace.The attack was later repulsed by the Zamorin's Nair troops with 300 to 500 Portuguese killed and the remaining barely even surviving. The top floors of the mosque still display some of that damage. Mishkal Mosque originally had five stories. It was rebuilt in 1578/79 after the 1510 arson and now has four stories. Typical for similar medieval mosques in Kerala, it has no cupolas and minarets and heavily employs timber.

A large tank known as the Kuttichira tank is attached to the mosque. The mosque has 47 doors, 24 carved pillars and a big prayer hall that can accommodate around 400 people.  The prayer hall is well ventilated and there is a wooden member with beautiful motifs.

References

External links

 Muslim Architecture of South India (Mehrdad Shokoohy) Routledge, 2011

Buildings and structures in Kozhikode
Mappilas
Mosques in Kerala
Religious buildings and structures in Kozhikode district
Sunni mosques in India
Shafi'i